Alain Grandbois,  (May 25, 1900 – March 18, 1975) was a Canadian Quebecer poet, considered the first great modern one.

Traveling around the world in 1918-1939 and sharing the hopes and problems of contemporary man, his work combined the themes of exploring the secrets of the world and studying human destiny, the writing and subject matter having a depth and breadth new to Quebec and becoming a model for young poets of the 1950s.

There is a plaque on the house in which he was born.

Selected works
 Né à Québec: Louis Jolliet (1933)
 Îles de la nuit (1944)
 Avant le chaos (1945)

Honors
 In 1950, he was awarded the Ludger-Duvernay Prize
 In 1954, he was awarded the Royal Society of Canada's Lorne Pierce Medal.
 In 1967, he was made a Companion of the Order of Canada.
 In 1970, he was awarded the Government of Quebec's Prix Athanase-David.

References

External links
 

20th-century Canadian poets
Canadian male poets
Companions of the Order of Canada
Writers from Quebec
1900 births
1975 deaths
Canadian poets in French
Prix Athanase-David winners
20th-century Canadian male writers